Wugigarra is a genus of Australian cellar spiders that was first described by B. A. Huber in 2001.

Species
 it contains twenty-two species, found in Western Australia, New South Wales, Queensland, and South Australia:
Wugigarra arcoona Huber, 2001 – Australia (South Australia)
Wugigarra bujundji Huber, 2001 – Australia (Queensland)
Wugigarra bulburin Huber, 2001 – Australia (Queensland)
Wugigarra burgul Huber, 2001 – Australia (Queensland)
Wugigarra eberhardi Huber, 2001 – Australia (New South Wales)
Wugigarra gia Huber, 2001 – Australia (Queensland)
Wugigarra idi Huber, 2001 – Australia (Queensland)
Wugigarra jiman Huber, 2001 – Australia (Queensland)
Wugigarra kalamai Huber, 2001 – Australia (Western Australia)
Wugigarra kaurna Huber, 2001 – Australia (South Australia)
Wugigarra mamu Huber, 2001 – Australia (Queensland)
Wugigarra muluridji Huber, 2001 – Australia (Queensland)
Wugigarra nauo Huber, 2001 – Australia (South Australia)
Wugigarra sphaeroides (L. Koch, 1872) – Australia (Queensland)
Wugigarra tjapukai Huber, 2001 (type) – Australia (Queensland)
Wugigarra undanbi Huber, 2001 – Australia (Queensland)
Wugigarra wanjuru Huber, 2001 – Australia (Queensland)
Wugigarra wiri Huber, 2001 – Australia (Queensland)
Wugigarra wulpura Huber, 2001 – Australia (Queensland)
Wugigarra wunderlichi (Deeleman-Reinhold, 1995) – Australia (Queensland)
Wugigarra yawai Huber, 2001 – Australia (Queensland, New South Wales)
Wugigarra yirgay Huber, 2001 – Australia (Queensland)

See also
 List of Pholcidae species

References

Araneomorphae genera
Pholcidae
Spiders of Australia